Final Articles Revision Convention may refer to either of two International Labour Organization conventions:

Final Articles Revision Convention, 1946
Final Articles Revision Convention, 1961